Staroglushinka is a rural locality (a selo) in Gonoshikhinsky Selsoviet, Zarinsky District, Altai Krai, Russia. The population was 212 as of 2013. There are 8 streets.

Geography 
Staroglushinka is located 25 km northwest of Zarinsk (the district's administrative centre) by road. Novokrasilovo is the nearest rural locality.

References 

Rural localities in Zarinsky District